John Horace Dickey (4 September 1914 – 27 April 1996) was a Liberal party member of the House of Commons of Canada. He was a barrister, executive and lawyer by career.

He was first elected to Parliament at the Halifax riding in a by-election on 14 July 1947 which was called after the death of William Chisholm MacDonald, one of the riding's Liberal incumbents. Since Halifax riding elected two members to the House of Commons at that time, Dickey joined the other incumbent, fellow Liberal Gordon Benjamin Isnor. Both Dickey and Isnor were re-elected in the 1949 election. Isnor was appointed to the Senate in May 1950 and was joined by another Liberal, Samuel Rosborough Balcom, following a by-election the following month. Both Dickey and Balcom were re-elected to a full term in Parliament in the 1953 election, but were defeated in the 1957 federal election by the two Progressive Conservative party candidates Robert McCleave and Edmund L. Morris. In the 1958 election, Dickey was joined by Leonard Kitz in an unsuccessful attempt to win back the riding for the Liberals. Dickey died in 1996 aged 81.

References

External links
 

1914 births
1996 deaths
20th-century Canadian lawyers
Lawyers in Nova Scotia
Liberal Party of Canada MPs
Members of the House of Commons of Canada from Nova Scotia
Politicians from Edmonton